A winch is a mechanical device used to pull in, let out, or otherwise adjust the tension of a rope or cable.

Winch or winching may also refer to:

People 

Eli Winch (1848–1938), an American manufacturer and politician
Ernest Winch (1879–1957), a Canadian politician from British Columbia 
Harold Winch (1907–1993), a Canadian politician
Hope Winch (1894 - 1944), English pharmacist 
Humphrey Winch (1555–1625), a judge who had a distinguished career in Ireland and England
Sir Humphrey Winch, 1st Baronet (1622–1703), an English politician
Joan Winch (born 1935), Australian nurse and educator
Nathaniel John Winch (1768–1838), English merchant, botanist and geologist
Peter Winch (1926–1997), a British philosopher 
Ruth Winch (1870–1952), a British tennis player

Activities 
 Off-roading#Winch events with 4x4 vehicles in harsh environments termed "winching"

See also 
Winch baronets, a title in the Baronetage of England
Largo Winch, a Belgian comic book series
Wrench (disambiguation)